Iceland has participated in the Eurovision Song Contest 34 times since its debut in , missing only two contests since then, in  and , when prevented from competing due to finishing outside qualification places the preceding years. The Icelandic broadcaster for the contest is Ríkisútvarpið (RÚV), which also broadcasts Iceland's national selection competition, Söngvakeppnin.

Iceland has achieved a total of seven top ten placements, with the others being Stjórnin finishing fourth, Heart 2 Heart seventh, Birgitta eighth, Hatari tenth and Daði og Gagnamagnið fourth. Since the introduction of the semi-final round in 2004, Iceland has failed to qualify for the final seven times, including four years consecutively (2015–18).  Iceland is the only Nordic country that is yet to win the contest.

History
Iceland's best position at the contest is second place, which they have achieved twice: in  when Selma represented Iceland with the song "All Out of Luck", and came second to 's Charlotte Nilsson and in  when Yohanna came second to 's Alexander Rybak with the ballad "Is It True?".

In contrast Iceland's worst result in a grand final is last place, which has been achieved twice to date: In  when Daníel Ágúst received nul points for his entry "Það sem enginn sér" and in  when Two Tricky received 3 points for their entry "Angel".

In , Iceland reached the final for the first time since then, when Euroband sang "This Is My Life".

Despite these mixed fortunes, Iceland is the second most successful country never to win the contest (behind only ).

Sigríður Beinteinsdóttir has participated five times (as a member of a group in 1990 and 1992, as a solo artist in 1994, and as a background vocalist in 1991 and 2006). Hera Björk has participated four times (as a backing vocalist in 2008, 2009 and 2015, and as a solo artist in 2010). Stefán Hilmarsson has participated twice (as a member of a group in 1988 and as a member of a duo in 1991), as have Selma Björnsdóttir (1999 and 2005), Eiríkur Hauksson (as a member of a group in 1986 and as a solo artist in 2007), Jón Jósep Snæbjörnsson (as a solo artist in 2004 and as a member of a duo in 2012) and Greta Salóme Stefánsdóttir (as a member of a duo in 2012 and as a solo artist in 2016).

Participation overview

Related involvement

Conductors

Heads of delegation

Commentators and spokespersons

Iceland has broadcast the show since 1970. The first to be broadcast live was the 1983 edition after the plan to broadcast the 1982 contest failed. Since 1985, RÚV has broadcast the contest on the radio using same commentator for TV and radio and the Internet broadcast since early 2000s.

Other shows

Gallery

In popular culture
The 2020 Netflix comedy film Eurovision Song Contest: The Story of Fire Saga depicts Will Ferrell and Rachel McAdams as a fictional duo from Iceland competing in Eurovision. Hannes Óli Ágústsson, who plays Olaf Yohansson in the film, reprised the role for the voting segment of the  final, in which he presented the points on behalf of the Icelandic jury.

Notes

References

 
Countries in the Eurovision Song Contest